The Rauw Alejandro World Tour was the second concert tour by Puerto Rican singer Rauw Alejandro, in support of his first two studio albums, Afrodisíaco (2020) and Vice Versa (2021). It began on July 15, 2021 in Raleigh and concluded on December 18 of that year in Miami, with several shows throughout United States, Mexico, Spain, Puerto Rico, and Dominican Republic. Puerto Rican singer Eix served as a supporting act on the tour. The tour was met with highly positive reviews from critics, who complimented Alejandro's dance moves and choreography. His four sold-out shows at the José Miguel Agrelot Coliseum in San Juan had grossed over $3,086,525 from an audience of 51,692.

Background
On June 10, 2021, Rauw Alejandro formally announced the Rauw Alejandro World Tour, with 37 shows across the United States, Mexico, and Spain from July 15, 2021, to January 15, 2022. Tickets went on sale the following day through his website. The tour was presented by Duars Entertainment, with the support of Kirk Taboada and Zamora Entertainment, to promote the singer's first two studio albums, Afrodisíaco (2020) and Vice Versa (2021).

On June 21, 2021, he announced that he would also perform at the José Miguel Agrelot Coliseum in San Juan, Puerto Rico, for his tour: "I am very happy with this news. I have my first concert where I always dreamed of singing and where life saw me grow, I love you." Alejandro later announced new American dates in multiple cities such as San Antonio, El Paso, and Reading. Puerto Rican singer Eix served as the opening act of the first leg in the United States. In October 2021, Alejandro announced two new dates in La Romana, Dominican Republic for November 2021, in which his team was criticized for the show's "very high" ticket prices.

Critical reception
The Rauw Alejandro World Tour was met with highly positive reviews from critics. Writing for Milwaukee Journal Sentinel, Piet Levy praised "all of Alejandro's standout talents", mentioning the "ingenuity of his music", "his sharp dance moves", and "his magnetic presence" in his performances, and stated that he proves he is "reggaeton's next superstar" on the tour. Jhoni Jackson from Rolling Stone described his show at the José Miguel Agrelot Coliseum as "celebratory", called the dancers' choreography "absolutely artful", and named Alejandro's rendition theatrical. She also praised the singer's "unstoppable" energy and enthusiasm, as well as his contagious "persistent elation". In her review of the same show for Primera Hora, Rosa Escribano Carrasquillo highlighted Alejandro's charisma, dance moves, flirtations with his fans, as well as the invited artists and the "colorful" images projected on the screens of the stage, and said he "managed to show security and mastery of the stage" during the concert". RTVE critic Miriam Martin gave his Barcelona's show a positive review, describing it as "great". She thought it "will remain forever etched in the memory of the fans" who attended the concert, complimented Alejandro's "mythical dances and choreographies" and his setlist for including "great songs after great songs".

Set list
This set list is representative of the show on October 21, 2021 in San Juan. It is not representative of all concerts for the duration of the tour.

"Dile a Él"
"Strawberry Kiwi"
"Mood"
"Que Le Dé"
"Enchule"
"Mírame"
"Una Noche"
"Tattoo"
"Nostálgico"
"Loquita"
"La Curiosidad"
"Elegí"
"Mi Llamada"
"Toda"
"Pensándote"
"Extrañándote"
"Nubes"
"Aquel Nap ZzZz"
"Brazilera"
"Química"
"Ponte Pa' Mí"
"Algo Mágico"
"Fantasías"
"Dembow 2020"
"Soy Una Gárgola"
"La Old Skul"
"Perreo Pesau'"
"El Efecto"
"Dream Girl (remix)"
"2/Catorce"
"Sexo Virtual"
"La Nota"
"Cúrame"
"Todo de Ti"

Special guests

Alejandro surprised fans throughout the tour with special guests, performing his collaborations with them.
 October 9, 2021 – Barcelona: Lyanno
 October 21, 2021 – San Juan: Lyanno, Reik, Farruko, and Chencho Corleone

Shows

Footnotes

References

2021 concert tours
Concert tours of Europe
Concert tours of Mexico
Concert tours of North America
Concert tours of Spain
Concert tours of the United States
Rauw Alejandro